Les Barker (30 January 1947 – 14 January 2023) was an English poet who was best known for his comedic poetry and parodies of popular songs, but also produced some very serious thought-provoking written works.

Biography 

Barker was born in Manchester, England, on 30 January 1947. He studied accountancy before he realised that he had a talent for writing. At the beginning of his career he toured around folk music venues as a solo performer, and later with The Mrs Ackroyd Band (named after his mongrel dog Mrs Ackroyd.) Barker was not a singer and the Mrs Ackroyd Band, with classically trained vocalists Hilary Spencer and Alison Younger, with keyboard player Chris Harvey, enabled his parodies to be sung live. He toured around Britain and such countries as Hong Kong, Australia, New Zealand, the United States and Canada.

Barker authored 77 books and released 20 albums. His books contain a mixture of monologues, comic songs, and serious songs. The monologues tip the hat to Marriott Edgar. Like Edgar, Barker has created several recurring characters and themes such as 'Jason and the Arguments', 'Cosmo the Fairly Accurate Knife Thrower', 'Captain Indecisive', 'The Far off Land of Dyslexia' and 'Spot of the Antarctic', which have become trademarks of Barker's work. Both his comic and serious songs have become standards for other singers such as Waterson–Carthy and June Tabor.

Barker was also one of the few writers (alongside Stephen Sondheim, with his parody "The Boy From...") to get the Welsh place named Llanfairpwllgwyngyllgogerychwyrndrobwllllantisiliogogogoch into a song successfully (it forms the main chorus of a song of the same name, and is sung four times). In the mid 2000s, Barker moved to Wrexham, Wales, and learnt Welsh, producing two books of poetry written in the Welsh tongue.

In 2008 he was awarded the NIACE Inspire Award as Welsh Learner of the Year, and recited his poem "Have you Got Any News of the Iceberg?" in Welsh at the presentation in Swansea.

In 2009, a campaign by his folk fanbase sought to have him chosen as the British Poet Laureate.

After a heart attack in January 2008, Barker began solo gigging again. Barker remained firmly rooted in the circuit of folk clubs and festivals. He has also performed as part of a double act with Keith Donnelly under the name "Idiot and Friend".

After being diagnosed with cancer and undergoing chemotherapy, he announced his retirement from touring in October 2022, but intended to maintain his online presence via YouTube. 

On 14 January 2023, Barker attended a match of The New Saints F.C. at Park Hall in Oswestry, Shropshire. Afterward, he returned to his car and died from an apparent heart attack at the age of 75. His body was found in his car by maintenance staff the following morning.

Guide Cats for the Blind
Barker also wrote a poem called Guide Cats for the Blind which later became the title track of a double fundraising CD for the British Computer Association of the Blind (BCAB). The Association runs a program called EyeT4all, which aims to make computers accessible to people who are blind or visually impaired. Barker also agreed to the recording of a series of albums. Over £40,000 has been raised.

Five "Guide Cats" albums have been produced, Guide Cats for the Blind, Missing Persians File, Top Cat, White Tie and Tails, Cat Nav and Herding Cats. The CDs contain performances of Barker's poems by members of the folk world such as June Tabor, Martin Carthy, Steve Tilston, Mike Harding and Tom Paxton and well known figures including Jimmy Young, Nicholas Parsons, Brian Perkins, Terry Wogan, Nicky Campbell, Robert Lindsay, Prunella Scales and Andrew Sachs.

Books

 Airedale
 Alexander Greyhound Bell
 Alsatians to Crewe
 Bark Odes
 Bark to Front
 The Beagle has Landed
 Beagles, Bangles and Beads
 Beyond Our Cairn
 The Boogie Woogie Beagle Boy from Company B
 Borzoi Ballet
 The Borzoi's Back in Town
 The Boxer Rebellion
 Break the Mole
 Collieflowers
 Corgasm
 Corgi and Bess
 Dachshunds With Erections Can't Climb Stairs
 Dog Byte
 Dog Ends
 Dog Gone
 Dog Only Nose
 Doggerel
 The English Book of Penguin Folk Songs
 Extra Terrierestrial
 Fetlar
 Get a Dog and Barker Yourself
 The Green Eye of the Little Yellow Dog
 Her Master's Book
 The Hound of Music
 The Hound of the Basketballs
 I Camel, I Saw, I Conker
 I Hear the Sound of Distant Plums
 Illegal Annual
 Irritable Bow-Wow Syndrome
 Jack Spaniel's
 King Charles Spaniel
 Labrador Rigby
 Lady & the Trampoline
 Llandrindod and One Dalmatians
 The Mabidogion
 Man and Doberman
 Mastiff Central
 Medlock Delta Blues
 Morocco and Things
 Mrs. Ack Royd's Again
 Mrs. Ackroyd's Diary
 O Camel Ye Faithful
 The Official Retriever
 Paws for Thought
 Pekinese Up Mother Brown
 Pup Yours
 A Quite Short Goat and a Pink Dalmatian
 Red Setters in the Sunset
 Reign of Terrier
 Rover the Hills and Far Away
 Rover the Rainbow
 Roverdance: The Poems
 Royders of the Lost Ack
 Sitting with My Dog on Display
 Something to Sniff At
 Songs for Swingin' Tails
 Spaniel in the Lion's Den
 Spencer's Dog Rover
 The First Mutt is the Cheapest
 The Stones of Callanish
 The Collar Purple
 The Mrs Ackroyd Occasional Table Book
 The Mrs Ackroyd Periodic Table Book
 The Ridgeback of Notre Dame
 A Tail of Two Setters
 Upper Cruft
 Vincent Van Dogh
 Viva a Spaniel
 Vodabone
 Waiting for Dogot
 Werneth Willie Ackroyd
 Wolfhound Amadeus Mozart
 101 Damnatians

Albums

 A Cardi and Bloke
 Airs of the Dog
 An Infinite Number of Occasional Tables
 Arovertherapy
 Dark Side of the Mongrel
 Dog 017 Yelp!
 Dogologues
 Earwigo
 Gnus & Roses
 Guide Cats for the Blind
 The Mrs. Ackroyd Rock'n'Roll Show
 Mrs. Ackroyd: Superstar!
 Oranges & Lemmings
 Probably the Best Album Ever Made by Anybody in Our Street
 Some Love
 The Missing Persians File
 The Stones of Callanish
 The War on Terrier
 Top Cat, White Tie and Tails
 Tubular Dogs
 Twilight of the Dogs
 Up the Creek without a Poodle
 The Wings of Butterflies
 Yelp!

References

External links
 Mrs Ackroyd (Band) Home Page
 Biography
 [ All Music Guide biography by Craig Harris]

1947 births
2023 deaths
20th-century English comedians
21st-century English comedians
English male poets
Writers from Manchester
20th-century English poets